The Night-Comers is a 1956 novel by Eric Ambler. In the United States it was published as State of Siege.

The cover artist when the book was reprinted by Pan Books was S. R. Boldero.

Plot

Steve Fraser is an engineer working  on a dam on the Southeast-Asian island of Sunda. Sunda is a former Dutch colony, which has recently become independent. Fraser's period of employment at an end, he goes to town to catch a plane out. He meets a half Dutch, half Sundan girl, Rosalie and both get caught up in a fundamentalist Islamic group's attempt to overthrow the provisional government and the subsequent battle around the radio station.An atmospheric tale of love and adventure.

Reception

The book was inspired by recent Indonesian National Revolution.

Kirkus Reviews described it as "a sophisticated, circumspect drama of revolution and political terrorism... Not as sinister a chimera of intrigue as his earlier books, but an assured adventure tale to which the shifty, shifting character of this part of the world lends substance."

References

English thriller novels
Novels by Eric Ambler
1956 British novels
Heinemann (publisher) books